Princess Konstancja Małgorzata Lubomirska (1761–1840) was a Polish noblewoman and artist. She was an amateur artist and some of her drawings are preserved.

She married Seweryn Rzewuski in 1782.

References
 Marek Jerzy Minakowski, Genealogia Potomków Sejmu Wielkiego (Genealogy of the Descendants of the Great Sejm). Sejm-Wielki

1761 births
1840 deaths
Konstancja Malgorzata Lubomirska